Goshen Township is one of the fifteen townships of Hardin County, Ohio, United States. As of the 2010 census the population was 562.

Geography
Located in the northeastern part of the county, it borders the following townships:
Jackson Township, Wyandot County - north
Marseilles Township, Wyandot County - northeast
Grand Township, Marion County - east
Montgomery Township, Marion County - southeast corner
Dudley Township - south
Pleasant Township - west
Jackson Township - northwest

No municipalities are located in Goshen Township.

Name and history
Goshen Township was organized in 1834. This township derives its name from the biblical Land of Goshen. It is one of seven Goshen Townships statewide.

Government
The township is governed by a three-member board of trustees, who are elected in November of odd-numbered years to a four-year term beginning on the following January 1. Two are elected in the year after the presidential election and one is elected in the year before it. There is also an elected township fiscal officer, who serves a four-year term beginning on April 1 of the year after the election, which is held in November of the year before the presidential election. Vacancies in the fiscal officership or on the board of trustees are filled by the remaining trustees.

References

External links
County website

Townships in Hardin County, Ohio
1834 establishments in Ohio
Populated places established in 1834
Townships in Ohio